Sonarang Twin Temples are two Hindu temples located in Sonarang village of Tongibari Upazila of Munshiganj district, Bangladesh. The western temple is taller than the eastern one, about 15 m high.

References

External Links 

Shiva temples
Kali temples
Hindu temples in Munshiganj district
19th-century Hindu temples